Sedlašek is a village in the Municipality of Podlehnik. It lies in the Haloze region of eastern Slovenia. The area belongs to the traditional Styria region. It is now included in the Drava Statistical Region.

References

External links
Sedlašek on Geopedia

Populated places in the Municipality of Podlehnik